The Atari Jaguar CD is a CD-ROM peripheral for the Jaguar video game console.

Atari announced a CD-ROM drive for the Jaguar before the console's November 1993 launch. It was originally scheduled for launch during the 1994 holiday shopping season, with multiple delays. The drive fits into the ROM cartridge slot atop the console, with its own pass-through cartridge slot to optionally run software that uses cartridge only or that uses cartridge and CD in tandem. The Memory Track cartridge stores saved game position and high scores. Several publications have criticized the Jaguar CD's design for resembling a toilet.

The Jaguar CD has a double-speed (2×) drive and built-in VLM (Virtual Light Machine) software by Jeff Minter, using a spectrum analyzer for a sophisticated video light show for audio CDs. It is bundled with Blue Lightning, Vid Grid, the Tempest 2000 soundtrack CD, and a Myst demo disc. Every startup screen is unique, using the VLM for a random light show.

Jaguar CDs can store up to 790MB, more than conventional CD-ROMs. Its proprietary CD format is based on the audio CD format, instead of standard CD-ROM data formats. It allows for more storage, and its incompatibility foils casual piracy, at the expense of reduced error correction.

Only 13 games were released for the Jaguar CD during its lifetime. However, previously unfinished and homebrew games have since been released.

In mid-1994 Atari and Sigma Designs signed an agreement to co-develop a PC board that would allow Jaguar CD games to be played on home computers, with a scheduled release by the end of 1994. However, it was never released.

Game library

See also

 64DD
 Famicom Disk System
 Sega CD
 Super NES CD-ROM
 Xbox 360 HD DVD Player

References

Computer-related introductions in 1995
Jaguar CD
CD-ROM-based consoles
Video game console add-ons
Fifth-generation video game consoles